The Clinique Saint-Jean (French) or Kliniek Sint-Jan (Dutch), meaning "Saint John Clinic", and historically known as the Saint-Jean-op-de-Poel hospital, is a private non-profit general hospital located in central Brussels, Belgium. Founded in 1195, it is Brussels' oldest hospital. Through the eight centuries of its existence, the Clinique Saint-Jean has been the founder of other major hospitals in the Brussels-Capital Region and of two nursing schools. It is currently part of the Réseau Santé Louvain network of the Université catholique de Louvain (UCLouvain).

References

Notes

Hospitals in Belgium
Catholic hospitals in Europe
Université catholique de Louvain
1195 establishments in Europe
Buildings and structures in Brussels
Buildings and structures completed in 1851